The 2016–17 North Texas Mean Green women's basketball team represents the University of North Texas during the 2016–17 NCAA Division I women's basketball season. The Mean Green, led by second year head coach Jalie Mitchell, play their home games UNT Coliseum, also known as The Super Pit, and were fourth year members of Conference USA. They finished the season 12–19, 8–10 in C-USA play to finish in a 3-way tie for eighth place. They advanced to the quarterfinals of the C-USA women's tournament where they lost to WKU.

Roster

Schedule

|-
!colspan=9 style="background:#059033; color:#000000;"| Exhibition

|-
!colspan=9 style="background:#059033; color:#000000;"| Non-conference regular Season

|-
!colspan=9 style="background:#059033; color:#000000;"| Conference USA regular Season

|-
!colspan="9" style="background:#059033; color:#000000;"| Conference USA Women's Tournament

See also
2016–17 North Texas Mean Green men's basketball team

References

North Texas Mean Green women's basketball seasons
North Texas
North Texas
North Texas